Haneda (written:  or ) is a Japanese surname. Notable people with the surname include:

, Japanese pianist
, Japanese footballer
, Japanese composer and pianist
, Japanese actor
, Japanese slalom canoeist
, Japanese rugby union player
, Japanese singer

Fictional characters 
, character in the manga series Case Closed (Detective Conan)

Japanese-language surnames